"Releasing the Demons" is a song by American rock band Godsmack from their third studio album, Faceless. It was written by frontman Sully Erna.

Song meaning

Godsmack lead singer Sully Erna is a Wiccan, and in the Wiccan religion, there is a threefold rule: Whatever you send out, whether it be good or bad, comes back to you three times. In this song, Erna had released demons from his body resulting in more demons returning. In the middle of the song, Erna speaks with laughter of the demons coming back to him threefold.

Other uses

The riff of this song is frequently used by radio talk show host Michael Smerconish as bumper music at the end of on-air segments.

Personnel

 Sully Erna – rhythm guitar, lead vocals
 Tony Rombola – lead guitar
 Robbie Merrill – bass
 Shannon Larkin – drums

References

Godsmack songs
Songs written by Sully Erna
2003 songs
Song recordings produced by David Bottrill
Modern pagan songs
Wicca in the United States